Greenbelt Festival is a festival of arts, faith and justice held annually in England since 1974. Greenbelt has grown out of an evangelical Christian music festival with an audience of 1,500 young people into its current form, a more inclusive festival attended at its peak around 2010 by around 20,000, including Christians and those from other faiths.

The festival regularly attracts the biggest names of Christian music and many mainstream musicians. Those that have played the festival in the past include both new and established musicians, mostly playing rock, folk and pop music. This list encompasses The Alarm, U2, Moby, Pussy Riot, Cliff Richard, Bruce Cockburn, Ed Sheeran, Martyn Joseph, Steve Taylor, Daniel Amos, Phatfish, Servant, Midnight Oil, Michael Franti and Spearhead, Over the Rhine, Iona, Amy Grant, Miles Cain, Lamb, Kevin Max, Lambchop, Goldie, Jamelia, After the Fire, Larry Norman, Randy Stonehill, Asian Dub Foundation, The Polyphonic Spree, Aqualung, Dum Dums, The Proclaimers, Daniel Bedingfield, Eden Burning, Duke Special, Why?, Athlete, Sixpence None the Richer, The Choir, Charlie Peacock and Delirious?.

Greenbelt is also a venue for teaching and discussion about (but not exclusively within) the Christian faith, and has attracted number of Christian speakers, including Rowan Williams (the former archbishop of Canterbury) who is currently the festival's patron. However, the festival also welcomes anyone who the organisers believe 'speaks for justice', and has recently had Anita Roddick, Peter Tatchell, Bill Drummond, and Billy Bragg sharing their thoughts.

More recently with its links to the NGO Christian Aid, Greenbelt has become heavily involved in campaigns for trade justice. The festival was one of the main catalysts for the huge Jubilee 2000 movement. Greenbelt is also a Christian showcase for performing arts, visual arts and alternative worship.

History
Greenbelt is a nomadic festival which has so far been held at seven different locations in England. While the venue has changed, the core event has remained the same: a celebration of faith, justice and arts with a particular Christian perspective.

The first Greenbelt Festival was held on a pig farm just outside the village of Charsfield near Woodbridge, Suffolk over the August 1974 bank holiday weekend, begun by Jim Palosaari, Kenneth Frampton, and James Holloway. Local fears concerning the festival in the weeks running up to it proved to be unfounded, but the festival did not return to the venue.

Between 1975 and 1981 the festival was held in the grounds of Odell Castle in Bedfordshire. The largest audiences for Greenbelt were during its two-year stay at Knebworth Park in Hertfordshire, 1982 and 1983.

1984 saw Greenbelt move to one of its longest-serving homes, Castle Ashby, Northamptonshire. While at Castle Ashby, Greenbelt began the practice of adopting an annual theme for the festival. Artists are encouraged to draw from the theme where possible.

Originally the 1992 festival was expected to be held at a new, permanent home on a farm a few miles away in Church Stowe. Greenbelt had finances in place to purchase the site, but met strong resistance from local residents. The plans collapsed and the festival returned to Castle Ashby one last time.

From 1993 to 1998 Greenbelt's home was the grounds of Deene Park, Northamptonshire. Putting the plan to purchase a permanent site on hold, Greenbelt instead negotiated with Deene Park's owner and invested in infrastructure improvements to this temporary site instead.

Following a downturn in audience figures and rising production costs, Greenbelt faced up to the inevitable in 1998: it was no longer financially viable to continue using the Deene Park site. A bold plan was devised. The 1998 event was pitched as the "last Greenbelt of its kind", with two festivals planned for 1999: a youth-oriented event "Freestate" in partnership with Spring Harvest to be held the August Bank Holiday weekend and a more family-oriented "Greenbelt" to be held over the last weekend in July at Cheltenham Racecourse.

In early 1999 plans for Freestate collapsed and its embryonic programme was hastily rolled into the Greenbelt planned for Cheltenham. The 1999 Greenbelt Festival took place at Cheltenham but saw the lowest audiences since the 1970s. It remains the only Greenbelt to have taken place other than on an August Bank Holiday weekend.

Greenbelt emerged from its financial difficulties in the early 2000s with ever-increasing audiences for festivals held at Cheltenham. In its last years at Cheltenham, although audiences were beginning to fall, they were over 20,000, comparable in numbers to those of its "glory days" in the early 1980s. In 2014 Greenbelt moved to Boughton House, Northamptonshire, due to the planned redevelopment of Cheltenham Racecourse, as well as part of the site being unusable after severe weather during the 2012 festival caused flash flooding across parts of the racecourse. Since the move the festival has been scaled back after a drop in numbers and possibly due to the related loss of finances.

Although there is constant tension between its faith-based origins and a more exploratory attitude to engaging with the world, the perspective of the festival remains one rooted in the Christian tradition, and drawing Christian music lovers.

A family of festivals
Greenbelt's vision is to be at the collision of arts, justice and faith. With the organisation's blessing, three other events have taken the same blueprint and created festivals along similar lines in other countries. The Solas Festival has been held in Scotland annually since 2010. The following year saw the first Wild Goose Festival in the United States, and in 2013 the Bet Lahem Live festival joined the informal family,

All events are run independently, with their own local flavour while acknowledging inspiration from Greenbelt.

Organisation
Greenbelt is a registered charity and incorporated at Companies House. It is overseen by a board of trustees/directors who are responsible for its governance. A small staff team is supplemented by a large base of volunteers and a number of subcontractors.

Reactions
These can be favourable amongst the initiated or quite negative. The Guardian sent Jessica Reed, a self-proclaimed atheist, to see the 2009 festival. Expecting to be turned off from the outset she mellowed to the point of admitting she became almost  but finally finding that the evangelism "lurked" under the surface, she left.

A Huffington Post report said, "How progressive politics, music and religion combine to make a festival where the loos are lovely and the people properly nice". The mix of Christians, environmental campaigners, Muslim clerics and atheists make this a heady mix, "The 700 Club at play it ain't."

Locations, themes and contributors

Photo gallery

Footnotes

References

External links
 Greenbelt official site
 Photos of Greenbelt 2007 from BBC Gloucestershire

Music festivals in England
Christian music festivals
Music festivals established in 1974